Separuh Aku (English: Half Me) was an Indonesian drama soap opera created by SinemArt and produced by Leo Sutanto. It was aired on RCTI, to October 15, 2012, to December 27, 2012, at 9:15 pm (21:15 PM). It is also composed music by Ichsan Nurrachman and Noah' keyboardist David Kurnia Albert.

The soap opera has been nominated for the Favorite Drama Series Program at the 16th Annual Panasonic Gobel Awards.

Main cast
 Asmirandah as Adara
 Rezky Aditya as Rama
 Miller Khan as Dennis
 Michella Putri as Maya
 Kevin Andrean as Reza
 Putri Anne as Naning
 Tia Ivanka as Tia
 Ari Wibowo as Sandy
 Adipura Prabahaswara as Sudiro
 Vira Yuniar as Marni
 Johan Jehan as Edi
 Triningtyas as Ida
 Suheil Fahmi Bisyir as Andi
 Malaki Gruno as Adit
 Shelsi Valencia as Andien
 Debby Sahertian as Mpok Siti
 Al Fathir Muchtar as Indra
 Fera Feriska as Shinta
 Sisy Syahwardi as Sissy
 Jonas Rivanno as Jonas

Controversy
Separuh Aku has been a controversy when it was stopped aired by RCTI since December 11 in 2012. Screenwriter Hilman Hariwijaya admitted that hasn't notification from the production house and SinemArt. In addition of according of Programming & Production Director Ella Kartika, the soap opera has stopped due to have a secret story revealed.

References

External links 
Separuh Aku

Indonesian television soap operas
2012 Indonesian television series debuts